The following is a timeline of the history of the city of Kinshasa, Democratic Republic of the Congo.

19th century

 14th -18th Century Kongo Kingdom reigned victorious throughout the land
 1881 - Léopoldville founded as a trading post by Henry Morton Stanley of the UK.
 1885 - Town becomes part of Congo Free State.
 1898 - Matadi–Kinshasa Railway built.

20th century

1900s-1950s
 1908 - Town becomes part of Belgian Congo.
 1909 - Banque du Congo Belge headquartered in Léopoldville (approximate date).
 1914 - Grand Hotel ABC built.
 1917 - Collège Saint-Joseph founded.
 1920 - Ligne Aérienne du Roi Albert (airline) begins operating.
 1923 - Capital of Belgian Congo relocated to Leopoldville from Boma.
 1928 -  newspaper begins publication.
 1935 - Association Sportive Vita Club formed.
 1936 - Daring Club Motema Pembe (football club) formed.
 1937
 Stade Reine Astrid (stadium) opens.
 Radio Leo begins broadcasting.
 Hotel Memling built.
 1938 - Amicale Sportive Dragons football club formed.
 1939 - Albert I of Belgium monument inaugurated on Place de la Gare.
 1940 - Radio Congo Belge begins broadcasting.
 1940s - Ngoma recording studio in business.
 1943 - École Saint-Luc à Gombe Matadi founded.
 1952 - Stade Roi Baudouin (stadium) inaugurated.
 1953
 N'djili Airport inaugurated.
 African Jazz (musical group) formed.
 1954 - Lovanium University established.
 1955
 Boulevard Albert I constructed.
 Presbyterian Community in Kinshasa founded.
 1956
 OK Jazz musical group formed.
 Colonial Governor-General residence built.
 1957 - Académie des Beaux-Arts (school) active.
 1958
 Trico Center for nuclear studies established.
 Plantations Lever au Congo (part of Unilever) headquartered in city.
 1959
 Anti-colonial riots led by the ABAKO political party.
 L'independance newspaper begins publication.

1960s-1990s
 1960
 City becomes capital of independent Republic of the Congo.
 Joseph Kulumba becomes bourgmestre, succeeded by Daniel Kanza.
 1961 - American School founded.
 1962
 National School of Law and Administration founded.
 Revolutionary Government of Angola in Exile based in Léopoldville.
 1963
 Boulevard Albert I renamed "Boulevard du 30 Juin".
 Zoao Boniface becomes bourgmestre.
 1964
 City becomes capital of Democratic Republic of the Congo.
 Hotel Memling built.
 Banque du Congo headquartered in city.
 1965 - Centre d'etudes pour l'action sociale established.
 1966 - Léopoldville renamed "Kinshasa."
 1967
 September: Organisation of African Unity summit held.
 National Conservatory of Music and Dramatic Art established.
 1969
 Kinshasa International Fair begins.
 Zaiko Langa Langa musical group formed.
 1971
 City becomes capital of Republic of Zaire.
 Office National des Transports headquartered in city.
 Inter Continental hotel in business.
 1972 - École d'Informatique d'Électronique founded.
 1974
 September: Zaire 74 music festival held.
 30 October: The Rumble in the Jungle boxing match held.
 Population: 2,008,352.
 1975 - Sozacom building constructed.
 1976 - Voix du Zaire broadcasting complex and BCZ building constructed.
 1977 - Zekete-zekete musical style developed.
 1979 - Palais du Peuple built.
 1981 - University of Kinshasa established.
 1982 - Le Potentiel newspaper begins publication.
 1984 - Population: 2,664,309.
 1985 - Meeting of the Association Internationale des Maires Francophones held in city.
 1988 - Madiaba musical style developed.
 1989
 Athletic Club Sodigraf formed.
 La Référence Plus newspaper begins publication.
 1990 - Population: 3,564,000 (urban agglomeration).
 1991
 Fundu Kota becomes governor.
 September: "Riots...by unpaid soldiers."
 October: Anti-Mobutu demonstrations.
 1992 - Kibabu Madiata Nzau becomes governor, succeeded by Bernardin Mungul Diaka.
 1994
 Orchestre Symphonique Kimbanguiste founded.
 Kamanyola Stadium opens.
 1996
 Mujinga Swana becomes governor, succeeded by Nkoy Mafuta.
 L'Avenir (Newspaper) begins publication.
 8 January: Airplane crash.
 1997
 Théophile Mbemba Fundu becomes governor.
 April: General Gabriel Amela Lokima Bahati becomes governor.
 May: City taken by anti-Mobutu forces led by Laurent-Désiré Kabila.
 Central Bank of the Congo headquartered in city.
 1998
 August: Second Congo War begins; rebel forces move toward city.
 September: Food shortage.
 1999 - United Nations Organization Stabilization Mission in the Democratic Republic of the Congo headquartered in Kinshasa.
 2000 - Population: 5,611,000 (urban agglomeration).

21st century

 2001
 January: President Laurent-Désiré Kabila assassinated.
 2002
 David Nku Imbié becomes governor.
 Lola ya Bonobo animal sanctuary located near city.
 2004
 March: Coup attempt.
 May: Jean Kimbunda becomes governor.
 2005
 Kimbembe Mazunga becomes governor.
 Population: 7,106,000 (urban agglomeration).
 2006
 Post-election unrest.
 Baudoin Liwanga becomes governor.
 2007
 March: Conflict between Bemba supporters and government forces.
 16 March: André Kimbuta becomes governor.
 City website online (approximate date).
 2010 - 2 June: Activist Floribert Chebeya killed.
 2011 - 27 February: Coup attempt.
 2012
 October: Organisation internationale de la Francophonie summit held.
 Population: 9,046,000.
 2013 - 30 December: December 2013 Kinshasa attacks by supporters of religious leader Mukungubila.
 2014
 11 May: Stade Tata Raphaël stampede.
  (hospital) opens.
 It's discovered that the origin of the HIV virus traces back to Léopoldville in the 1920s.
 2015 - January: 2015 Congolese protests.

See also
 History of Kinshasa
 Urban history of Kinshasa (in French)
 List of governors of Kinshasa
 Communes of Kinshasa
 List of television stations in Kinshasa
 Timelines of other cities in DR Congo: Bukavu, Goma, Kisangani, Lubumbashi
 History of the Democratic Republic of the Congo
 Timeline and history of Brazzaville, Republic of the Congo (across Congo River from Kinshasa)

References

This article incorporates information from the French Wikipedia.

Bibliography

in English
  + website

in French
 
 
  (Includes information about Kinshasa)

External links

 Flickr. Kinshasa in the '70s (set of photos)
  (Bibliography of open access  articles)
  (Images, etc.)
  (Images, etc.)
  (Bibliography)
  (Bibliography)
  (Bibliography)
  (Bibliography)
  (Bibliography) (see also "Leopoldville")

Images

Kinshasa
Kinshasa
Democratic Republic of the Congo history-related lists
Years in the Democratic Republic of the Congo
Kinshasa
Kinshasa